Mitalip Mamytovich Mamytov (Kyrgyz: Миталип Мамытович Мамытов; December 16, 1939) is a Soviet and Kyrgyz neurosurgeon.

Biography 
He was born on December 16, 1939 in the village of Kok-Zhar, Nookat District, Osh oblast of the Kirghiz SSR. His father died in World War II. Mitalip was brought up by his mother. He graduated with honors from high school in 1958.

In 1958–1960 he studied at the Kyzyl-Kiya Medical College, in 1960–1966 at the Kyrgyz State Medical Academy, from which he graduated with honors .

In 1966–1971 he passed clinical residency and postgraduate studies with the defense of his Candidate’s dissertation of neurosurgical problems of brain tumors at the Leningrad Research Institute of Neurosurgery named after A.L. Polenov.

He received a diploma of Candidate of Sciences in 1972.

Since 1971 (according to other data since) until 1973, he was in charge of the Department of Neurotraumatology of the Republican Clinical Hospital in Frunze (now Bishkek).

In 1973–1976, assistant professor, in 1976–1988 associate Professor, then Professor of the Department of Neurology and Neurosurgery of the Kyrgyz State Medical Academy from 1998 to the present (in 2017), head of the Department of Neurosurgery at KSMA.

He defended his doctoral thesis on neurosurgical problems of brain tumors in 1987 in Kiev. He received the title of Doctor of Sciences in 1988.

From 1997 to 2002 he was  Pro-rector for research of Kyrgyz State Medical Academy; from 2002 to 2005 he was Health Minister of the Kyrgyz Republic; from 2002 to 2007, he was  Rector of the Asian Medical Institute.

He is an Academician and member of the Presidium of the National Academy of Sciences of the Kyrgyz Republic.

He is the President of Kyrgyz Neurosurgical Association, honorary member of the associations of neurosurgeons of Russia, Kazakhstan and Uzbekistan, Honored Worker of Science of Kyrgyz Republic.

Scientific, pedagogical and practical activities 
As of 2017, he is the author of more than 260 scientific works, including 5 monographs, 8 patents, 5 textbooks, scientific supervisor of 2 doctoral and more than 10 Ph.D. theses.

Subject of scientific works: brain tumors, craniocerebral traumas, herniated intervertebral discs, neurosurgical aspects of inflammatory diseases of the brain, neurogenic degeneration of internal organs.

He performed more than 10,000 operations on the brain and spinal cord.

Awards and prizes 
1989 - he was awarded the title of "Honored Doctor of the Kyrgyz Republic".
1993 - he was awarded the title "Boeruker (merciful)"  by the Regional Committee of UNESCO.
1995 - he was awarded the anniversary medal "Manas".
1997 - by decree of the President of the Kyrgyz Republic No. 45 of 04.02.1997 he was awarded the "Dank" medal
2002 he was awarded the international award "Rukhaniyat".
2003 he was awarded the Order of "Manas" III degree.
2008 he was awarded the gold medal of the World Intellectual Property Organization (Geneva, Switzerland).

 2011, he was awarded the state prize in the field of science and technology as one of the authors of the work "Optimization of specialized care for hemorrhagic strokes in the Kyrgyz Republic"
 August 30, 2011 he was awarded the title of «Hero of the Kyrgyz Republic»

In 2015 he was awarded 
the prize named after I. K. Akhunbaev "Golden Scalpel" Public by the Fund " Giving a life named after I. K. Akhunbaev".
the medal "Alykul Osmonov" .

In 2016 he was awarded the medal named "Chyngiz Aitmatov".
In 2017 he was awarded the medal "For Merits to KSMA".
2022  -   "Star of the Commonwealth" award

Notes 

Government ministers of Kyrgyzstan
Kyrgyzstani neurosurgeons
1939 births
Living people
Soviet surgeons